Holy Spirit Academy is a private Catholic school in Monticello, Minnesota, in the United States. It is located in the Roman Catholic Archdiocese of Saint Paul and Minneapolis.

Opened in 2014, Holy Spirit Academy has an integrated program and teaches in the Catholic intellectual tradition. It was formally recognized as a Catholic school on October 2, 2020 by the Archdiocese of St. Paul and Minneapolis.

Students attend Mass Wednesday through Friday, have regular access to the sacrament of Reconciliation, and daily communal prayer, as well as Lauds each morning.

The Academy's Mission Statement is as follows: "Holy Spirit Academy is a private high school in the Catholic intellectual tradition offering an integrated academic program. The school’s Christ-centered approach to education fosters an environment grounded in the Truth, which prepares students for a life at the service of others. Through the action of the Holy Spirit and with the intercession of Archbishop Fulton Sheen, the academy strives to help students realize their God given purpose, instilling in them confidence to enrich the current culture."

References

External links
Holy Spirit Academy

Schools in Wright County, Minnesota
Catholic secondary schools in Minnesota
Roman Catholic Archdiocese of Saint Paul and Minneapolis